Tardif is a French surname. Notable people with this name include:

 Alain Tardif (born 1946) Canadian politician
 Chris Tardif (born 1979) British soccer player
 Claudette Tardif (born 1947) Canadian politician
 Denis Tardif, Canadian politician
 Emiliano Tardif (born 1928) Canadian Roman Catholic missionary
 Graham Tardif, Australian composer
 Guy Tardif (1935–2005), Canadian politician
 Jamie Tardif (born 1985) Canadian ice hockey player
 Jean-Claude Tardif, Canadian cardiologist
 Joseph Tardif (1860–1920) Australian cricketer
 Luc Tardif (born 1953), Canadian-born French ice hockey player and executive
 Luc Tardif Jr. (born 1984) French ice hockey player
 Marc Tardif (born 1949) Canadian ice hockey player
 Marie-Louise Tardif, Canadian politician
 Monique Tardif (born 1936) Canadian politician
 Patrice Tardif (born 1970) Canadian ice hockey player
 Patrice Tardif (politician) (1904–1989) Canadian politician
 Paul Tardif (1908–1998) Canadian politician

 Étienne Tardif de Pommeroux de Bordesoulle (1771–1837) French nobleman
 Jean Charles Louis Tardif d'Hamonville (1830–1889) French biologist
 Laurent Duvernay-Tardif (born 1991) Canadian American-football player
 Yanette Delétang-Tardif (1902–1976) French artist

See also

 Tardiff, surname